A medical isotope is an isotope used in medicine.

The first uses of isotopes in medicine were in radiopharmaceuticals, and this is still the most common use. However more recently, separated  stable isotopes have also come into use.

Examples of non-radioactive medical isotopes are:

 Deuterium in deuterated drugs
 Carbon-13 used in liver function and metabolic tests

Radioactive isotopes used
Radioactive isotopes are used in medicine for both treatment and diagnostic scans. The most common isotope used in diagnostic scans is Tc-99m (Technetium-99m), being used in approximately 85% of all nuclear medicine diagnostic scans worldwide. It is used for diagnoses involving a large range of body parts and diseases such as cancers and neurological problems. Another well-known radioactive isotope used in medicine is I-131 (Iodine-131), which is used as a radioactive label for some radiopharmaceutical therapies or for the treatment of some types of thyroid cancer.

References

External links 
Radionuclide production simulator – IAEA 

 
Medicinal radiochemistry
Chemicals in medicine